Transport in Spain is characterised by an extensive network of roads, railways (including the world's second longest high speed rail network), rapid transit, air routes, and ports. Its geographic location makes it an important link between Europe, Africa, and the Americas. Major forms of transit generally radiate from the capital, Madrid, located in the centre of the country, to link with the capitals of the autonomous communities.

Spanish transit is marked by a high degree of integration between its long-distance railway system and inner-city metro systems, although the historic use of broad gauge has limited integration with its neighbours. Spain is currently working to increase and improve linkage with the rail systems of France and Portugal, including the high-speed rail line between Madrid and Lisbon.

Spain's highway system is highly developed, with both tolled and free motorways.

Air traffic is routed through several international and regional airports, the largest of which is Barajas International Airport in Madrid.

Rail transport and AVE transport 

Spanish railways date from 1848. The total route length in 2017 was 15,333 km, of which 9,699 km were electrified. Four different track gauges are used in Spain.

Iberian gauge: 11,333 km (6,538 km electrified at 3 kV DC)
Standard gauge: 2,571 km (all electrified at 25 kV AC)
Narrow gauge: 1,207 km (400 km electrified)
Narrow gauge: 28 km (all electrified)

Most railways are operated by Renfe; narrow gauge lines are operated by FEVE and other carriers in individual autonomous communities. It is proposed to build or convert more standard gauge lines, including some dual gauging of broad gauge lines, especially where these lines link to adjacent countries.

A high-speed rail line (AVE) between Madrid and Seville was completed in 1992. In 2003, high-speed service was inaugurated on a new line from Madrid to Lleida and extended to Barcelona in 2008. The same year, lines from Madrid to Valladolid and from Córdoba to Málaga were inaugurated. In 2010, AVE line Madrid-Cuenca-Valencia was inaugurated.

Cities with metro/light rail systems

 Alicante - Alicante Tram
 Barcelona - Barcelona Metro & Tram
 Bilbao - Bilbao Metro & Bilbao tram (Euskotren Tranbia)
Castellon - Trolleybus
 A Coruña - under construction
 Granada - Granada Metro
 Jaén - Jaén Tram - completed but not operated
 Madrid - Madrid Metro
 Málaga - Málaga Metro
 Murcia - Murcia tram
 Palma - Palma Metro
 Parla - Parla Tram
 Santa Cruz de Tenerife - Tenerife Tram
 Seville - Seville Metro & MetroCentro
 Valencia - Metrovalencia
 Vélez-Málaga - Vélez-Málaga Tram - ceased operations
 Vitoria-Gasteiz - Vitoria-Gasteiz tram (Euskotren Tranbia)
 Zaragoza - Zaragoza Tram

Railway links with adjacent countries 

  Andorra – no (Andorra has no railways)
  France – yes/no – break-of-gauge/()/() (new high-speed line without any break-of-gauge)
  Portugal – yes, same gauge
  Morocco – no – proposed undersea tunnel. break-of-gauge/()
  Gibraltar – no (Gibraltar has no railways)

Tunnel across the Strait of Gibraltar 

In December 2003, Morocco and Spain agreed to explore the construction of an undersea rail tunnel across the Strait of Gibraltar, to connect their rail systems.

High-speed rail 

Alta Velocidad Española (AVE) is a high-speed rail service in Spain operated by Renfe, the Spanish national railway company, at speeds of up to 310 km/h (193 mph). The name is literally translated from Spanish "Alta Velocidad Española" (Spanish High Speed), but its initials are also a play on the word ave, meaning "bird". As of December 2011, the Spanish AVE system is the longest HSR network in Europe with 2,665 km (1,656 mi) and the second in the world after China.

AVE trains run on a network of dedicated high-speed rail track owned and managed by Adif. The first line was opened in 1992, connecting the cities of Madrid, Córdoba, and Sevilla. Unlike the rest of the Spanish broad-gauge network, the AVE uses standard gauge tracks, permitting direct connections outside Spain. Some TGV-derived trains do run on the broad-gauge network at slower speeds, and these are branded separately as Euromed.

On the line from Madrid to Seville, the service guarantees arrival within five minutes of the advertised time, and offers a full refund if the train is delayed further, although only 0.16% of trains have been so. In this regard, the punctuality of the AVE is exceptional compared to other non-long-distance Renfe services. On other AVE lines, this punctuality promise is more lax (15 minutes on the Barcelona line). A possible reason for this is that AVE services slow down to 200 km/h for the Sierra Morena section of the journey because of the tight curves and 250 km/h for the Córdoba-Seville section, possibly on account of medium-speed services running on the line, meaning that they have an easy means of recovering lost time if held up earlier in the journey.

In 2020, access to the Spanish high-speed network was liberalised, and the AVE has since been joined by private competitors Ouigo España and Iryo.

The AVE connects the following cities:

 Madrid – Valencia
 Barcelona – Madrid
 Sevilla – Madrid
 Ciudad Real – Madrid
 Tarragona – Madrid
 Valladolid – Madrid
 Madrid – Toledo
 Madrid – Cordoba
 Madrid – Elche
Since the high-speed route between Barcelona to Madrid was launched in 2008, 75% of travelers now choose the train over the airplane, with flight passengers accounting for 25% of travelers.

Road system

 Total: 681,298 km (2008)
 Expressways: 17,228 km (2018)

Highways in Spain are divided into "autopista"s and "autovía"s, the former being controlled-access highways. As of 2019, Spain had 12,255 km of roads designated as part of the European comprehensive TEN-T network, of which 10,932 km are motorways. Bridges accounted for 220 km (2.1%) of this network and tunnels for a further 86 km (0.8%).

Waterways
There are 1,045 km of waterways, but they have minor economic importance.

Pipelines
Gas: 7,962 km
Oil: 622 km;
Refined products: 3,447 km (2006)

Ports and harbors

The most important ports and harbours are Algeciras, Barcelona, Valencia, Bilbao and Las Palmas. Other major ports and harbours include Alicante, Almería, Cádiz, Cartagena, A Coruña, Ceuta, Huelva, Málaga, Melilla, Gijón, Palma de Mallorca, Sagunto, Santa Cruz de Tenerife, Los Cristianos (Tenerife), Santander, Tarragona, Vigo, Motril, Seville, Castellón de la Plana, Pasaia, Avilés, and Ferrol.

Merchant marine

 Total: 169 ships (1000 GT or over) 1,902,839 GT/ 
 Ships by type (2006): 
Bulk carrier: 9
Cargo: 13
Chemical tanker: 14
Container: 27
Liquefied gas: 9
Passenger: 1
Passenger/cargo: 49
Petroleum tanker: 15
Refrigerated cargo: 5
Roll on/roll off: 20
Specialized tanker: 2
Vehicle carrier: 5

Air transport
Domestic air transport is in fierce competition with the AVE. For example, the Madrid-Barcelona route was Europe's busiest air route prior to the opening of a high speed rail line in this corridor. Air traffic is also the main mode of transport linking the Balearic and Canary Islands to the mainland.

Airports – with paved runways 

Total: 96 (2006 est.)
10,000 ft (3,048 m) and over: 16
8,000 to 9,999 ft (2,438 to 3,047 m): 10
5,000 to 7,999 ft (1,524 to 2,437 m): 20
3,000 to 4,999 ft (914 to 1,523 m): 24
under 3,000 ft (914 m): 26

Main airports are Madrid, Barcelona, Palma de Mallorca, Málaga, Gran Canaria, Alicante, and Tenerife South.

Airports – with unpaved runways 
Total: 61 (2006 est.)
5,000 to 7,999 ft (1,524 to 2,437 m): 2
3,000 to 4,999 ft (914 to 1,523 m): 15
under 3,000 ft (914 m): 44

Airlines based in Spain 
Iberia Airlines
Air Europa
Wamos Air
Vueling Airlines
Binter Canarias
Pyrenair
Islas Airways
Easyjet

Heliports 
In 2009, there were 298 heliports.

See also
 Plug-in electric vehicles in Spain

References